Armelle Le Bras-Chopard is a French political scientist. She is a professor emeritus at the Université de Versailles Saint-Quentin-en-Yvelines. Her research encompasses democracy, socialism, war, and society, with particular reference to gender issues within these subjects. Her notable works include Première dame, second rôle (2009), Les putains du Diable. Le procès en sorcellerie des femmes (2006), Le masculin, le sexuel et le politique (2004), among others.

Awards
She won the Prix Médicis du meilleur essai in 2000 for Le Zoo des philosophes.

References

21st-century French writers
French women writers
French political scientists
Academic staff of Versailles Saint-Quentin-en-Yvelines University
Prix Médicis essai winners
Living people
Year of birth missing (living people)
Women political scientists
21st-century French women